"Hey Harmonica Man" is a single released by Stevie Wonder in 1964 from his album, Stevie at the Beach.  It peaked at No. 29 on the Billboard Hot 100.  Billboard said that "Stevie has hung his harmonica on a strong beat and a hit sound."

Charts

References

Stevie Wonder songs
Motown singles
1964 singles
1964 songs